Don McKay (January 28, 1925 – December 26, 2018) was an American actor, dancer and singer.

McKay was born in Buttermilk Hill, West Virginia.

He played in musicals like Make a Wish and Top Banana in 1951, and West Side Story in 1958 and 1964, as well as Show Boat in 1959 and On the Town in 1963.

McKay began teaching voice in Connecticut in 1957 and acting in regional theater there.

References

1925 births
2018 deaths
Actors from Clarksburg, West Virginia
People from Manhattan
American male actors
20th-century American male actors
20th-century American singers
American male dancers
20th-century American dancers
20th-century American male singers